The following is a list of Lima-Hamilton locomotives built between 1949 and 1951.  Lima-Hamilton never gave its locomotives model numbers in the ordinary sense. L-H only used specification numbers for its diesel models.

Switchers

Roadswitcher

Transfer unit

External links
 Sarberenyi, Robert. Lima Diesel Switcher Original Owners
 Sarberenyi, Robert. Lima Diesel Roadswitcher Original Owners
 Sarberenyi, Robert. Lima Diesel Transfer Original Owners

References 

 
Lima-Hamilton diesel locomotives